Augšdaugava Municipality ("upper Daugava municipality") is one of the 35 municipalities established in Latvia in 2021. It surrounds the independent city of Daugavpils and its municipal headquarters are located there. Its first elected municipal council has taken office on 1 July 2021.

Geography

It is located in the southwestern part of the Latgale region in eastern Latvia, and surrounds the city of Daugavpils on all sides. It borders Jēkabpils Municipality to the northwest, Līvāni Municipality to the north, Preiļi Municipality to the northeast, and Krāslava Municipality to the east. It also borders the Lithuanian counties of Panevėžys and Utena to the west and southwest respectively, and Vitebsk Region in Belarus to the southeast.

It is the site of a ski resort.

The Daugava flows into the municipality from the east and turns north at Daugavpils. The Daugava valley east of Daugavpils is a Protected Landscape Area which extends into Krāslava Municipality.

A third Protected Landscape Area located in the northern part of the municipality is Nīcgale forest in Nīcgale Parish.

History
Augšdaugava Municipality corresponds in extent to the former Daugavpils District as it existed from 1967 to 2009. In the 2009 territorial reforms, Daugavpils District was divided into the municipalities of Daugavpils and Ilūkste. In 2020, the Saeima approved reducing the number of administrative divisions at the municipal level from 119 to 42, including rejoining the municipalities of Daugavpils and Ilūkste to form Augšdaugava Municipality. Elections for Latvia's new municipal councils were held on 5 June 2021, and the new municipalities including Augšdaugava went into effect on 1 July 2021.

Administration

Augšdaugava Municipality elected 15 councillors in the 2021 local elections. The municipality is to form joint authorities with the city of Daugavpils for the administration of civil protection, education, and waste management.

The municipality is subdivided into two towns and 25 parishes:

Towns
Ilūkste 
Subate
Parishes
Ambeļi Parish
Bebrene Parish
Biķernieki Parish
Demene Parish
Dubna Parish
Dviete Parish
Eglaine Parish
Kalkūne Parish
Kalupe Parish
Laucesa Parish
Līksna Parish
Maļinova Parish
Medumi Parish
Naujene Parish
Nīcgale Parish
Pilskalne Parish
Prode Parish
Saliena Parish
Šēdere Parish
Skrudaliena Parish
Svente Parish
Tabore Parish
Vabole Parish
Vecsaliena Parish
Višķi Parish

Demographics
The Central Statistical Bureau of Latvia estimated a population of 25,927 living in what is now Augšdaugava Municipality at the beginning of 2021. This represented a 39% decrease from its estimated population of 42,483 at the beginning of 2000, and a 22% decrease from its estimated population of 33,222 at the beginning of 2011.

The populations of the towns of Ilūkste and Subate were estimated to be 2169 and 596 respectively at the beginning of 2021.

Economy and infrastructure
Augšdaugava is primarily an agricultural municipality: in 2005, 71% of the total area of the former Daugavpils District was used for agricultural purposes, mainly cereal and cattle farming. The municipality is served by national roads A6, which connects Daugavpils to Jēkabpils and Riga to the northwest, and Krāslava and the Belarusian border to the east; A13, which runs from the Lithuanian border southwest of Daugavpils through Daugavpils and Rēzekne and the Russian border northeast of Kārsava; and A14, a western bypass of Daugavpils. The Riga–Daugavpils gas pipeline and the defunct Unecha–Polotsk–Ventspils branch of the Druzhba oil pipeline also run through the municipality. Daugavpils International Airport is located at Lociki in Augšdaugava Municipality northeast of Daugavpils.

References

 
Municipalities of Latvia
2021 establishments in Latvia
States and territories established in 2021